The 1740s BC was a decade lasting from January 1, 1749 BC to December 31, 1740 BC.

Events and trends
 1749 BC–Samsu-iluna succeeds Hammurabi as king of Babylon. However, his rule is not very effective, and Mesopotamia endures turmoil during his reign.
 c. 1740 BC–Akkadian-Assyrian governor Puzur-Sin drives the Babylonians and Amorites into the north, out of the land of Assyria.

Significant people
 Rim-Sin I, ruler of the Middle Eastern city-state of Larsa since 1758 BC
 Samsu-iluna, king of Babylon

References

18th century BC